Colonel Delmiro Gouveia is a 1978 Brazilian drama film directed by Geraldo Sarno. It was screened in the Un Certain Regard section at the 1978 Cannes Film Festival. The film accounts the story and exploits of "colonel" Delmiro Gouveia, one of the earliest industrial entrepreneurs of Brazil, founder of the Corrente factories.

Cast
 Rubens de Falco as Delmiro Gouveia
 Sura Berditchevsky as Eulina
 Nildo Parente as Lionello Lona
 Joffre Soares as Ulisses Luna
 José Dumont as Zé Pó
 Magalhães Graça as Dantas Barreto
 Conceição Senna as Zé Pó's wife 
 Alvaro Freire as Isidoro
 Maria Alves as Jove
 Dennis Bourke as Mister Hallam
 Harildo Deda as Zé Rodrigues
 Maria Adélia as Augustas
 Henrique Almeida as Osvaldo
 João Gama as station master

References

External links

1970s biographical drama films
1978 films
1978 drama films
1970s Portuguese-language films
Brazilian biographical drama films
Films set in Bahia
Films set in the 19th century
Films set in the 20th century